The Jacob and Cristina Thunborg House is a historic log cabin located at Chicken Point in Hayden Lake, Idaho. It was built in 1893-1902 by Jacob Thunborg and his wife Cristina, two Swedish immigrants who became homesteaders in Idaho. The Thunborgs lived here with their son, Frank, and their daughter, Lena. It was inherited by their daughter-in-law, Frances Thunborg, who lived here until 1960. The house has been listed on the National Register of Historic Places since September 12, 1985.

References

		
National Register of Historic Places in Kootenai County, Idaho
Houses completed in 1893